Kanniainen is a Finnish surname. Notable people with the surname include:

Kyösti Kanniainen (1871–1915), Finnish journalist and politician
Juho Kanniainen (1875–1929), Finnish farmer, lay preacher and politician
Vesa Kanniainen (born 1948), Finnish economist

Finnish-language surnames